John Doe No. 24 (born , died November 28, 1993) was the name given to a deaf and later blind man in Jacksonville, Illinois, who was put in a mental institution in 1945 as a teenager. He spent 30 years at the Lincoln Developmental Center, and was transferred several times, eventually to a senior center in Peoria. He died in 1993 at the estimated age of 64. His life is covered by the biography God Knows His Name: The True Story of John Doe No. 24 by journalist David Bakke. Musician Mary Chapin Carpenter wrote a song about him, titled 'John Doe No. 24'.

Life 
In the early morning hours of October 11, 1945, two police officers found a black teenager wandering on the streets of Jacksonville, Illinois. He was quickly determined to be deaf and unable to communicate. Upon asking why he was wandering the streets, he could only write "Lewis", which is believed to be his name. No information could be found about him or his relatives. As such, a judge placed him in the Illinois mental health system, where he became known as John Doe No. 24. His name was later legally changed to John Doe Boyd in 1978 to allow him to apply for Social Security.

After spending years in mental health institutions, during which he slowly became blind, Boyd was transferred to the Smiley Living Center in Peoria in 1987. He died of a stroke on November 28, 1993, at the estimated age of 64.

Legacy
When American singer Mary Chapin Carpenter learned of Doe's life, she purchased a tombstone and placed it over his unmarked grave. Carpenter also wrote a song titled "John Doe No. 24" on the album Stones in the Road which was released in October 1994.

Books

References 

1929 births
1993 deaths
People from Jacksonville, Illinois
Unidentified people
American deafblind people
Year of birth uncertain